Koslov is a surname. Notable people with the surname include:

Alex Koslov (born 1984), professional wrestler
Nikolay Koslov, cross country skier
Vladimir Koslov (born 1958), bobsledder
Tamar Koslov, Voiced Prunella Deegan in Arthur

Fictional characters:
Vasili Ivanovich Koslov is the first playable protagonist in Call of Duty 2
Rabbi Joseph Koslov, from Babylon 5

See also
Koslov's pika, a mammal in the family Ochotonidae
Kozlov, a surname
Kozlovski, a surname